The 1998–99 San Jose Sharks season was the Sharks' eighth season of operation in the National Hockey League (NHL). Under second-year head coach Darryl Sutter, the Sharks reached the playoffs for a second consecutive season. While the team won three fewer games than it had during the prior season, it became the first in franchise history to score more goals (196) than it allowed (191).

During the campaign, general manager Dean Lombardi continued to add to the Sharks' roster. During the 1998 preseason, both goaltender Steve Shields and All-Star defenseman Gary Suter were acquired from the Buffalo Sabres and Chicago Blackhawks, respectively, in exchange for low-level draft picks and prospects. While neither played a major role during the 1998–99 season, both would make key contributions to the Sharks' success the following season. Indeed, Lombardi's most notable addition was that of veteran forward Vincent Damphousse. Damphousse, acquired in a midseason trade with the Montreal Canadiens, would experience immediate success in San Jose; he would ultimately remain with the Sharks until the conclusion of the 2003–04 season. The 1998–99 season also saw the continued development of several highly-touted prospects. Most notably, the campaign saw second-year forwards Patrick Marleau and Marco Sturm emerge as consistent scoring threats. Additionally, the season also saw the debut of promising young defenseman (and future NHL All-Star) Scott Hannan. These players, along with established forward Jeff Friesen and defenseman Mike Rathje, would drive much of the team's success over the following five years.

Despite their losing record, the Sharks reached the postseason for a second consecutive season. In the first round of the 1999 Stanley Cup playoffs, the Sharks were matched against the Northwest Division champion Colorado Avalanche. Due to the Columbine High School Massacre, the first two games of the series were played in San Jose; the heavily favored Avalanche won both. As had been the case one year prior, the Sharks won their next two games in Denver to even the series at two games apiece. The Avalanche responded by routing the Sharks in Game Five to take a 3–2 series lead. The Sharks managed to push the Avalanche to overtime in Game Six; a goal by Colorado rookie Milan Hejduk, however, spelled the end of the Sharks' season. As of the 2017–18 NHL season, the 1998–99 San Jose Sharks (along with the 1998–99 Edmonton Oilers) are the last team to have qualified for the Stanley Cup Playoffs with a losing record.

Off-season
Forward Owen Nolan was named team captain.

Regular season

The Sharks tied the Dallas Stars and St. Louis Blues for the fewest short-handed goals allowed, with 4.

Final standings

Schedule and results

Playoffs

Round 1 vs. Colorado

Player statistics

Awards and records

Transactions

Draft picks

See also
1998–99 NHL season

References
Bibliography
 
 

S
S
San Jose Sharks seasons
San Jose Sharks
San Jose Sharks